Henry T. Hesse (1879–1947) was a politician and farmer in the U.S. state of Oregon. A Republican, he served in the Oregon Legislative Assembly representing Hillsboro.

Early life
Hesse was one of four children of Christopher Frederick Hesse (d. 1919). He was a farmer, raising a herd of Guernsey cattle on a dairy near Hillsboro.

Political career
Hesse began his political career as a county commissioner for Washington County in the 1910s. He later served as school clerk in Hillsboro and on the board of the Washington County Fair. In 1938, he was elected as a Republican to District 4 of the Oregon House of Representatives, replacing Ray L. Antrim of Aloha. He served in the 1939, 1941, 1943, 1945 sessions before Harry Schmeltzer replaced him in District 4. Hesse won reelection in November 1946, but resigned due to poor health and died on July 17, 1947.

References

Republican Party members of the Oregon House of Representatives
Politicians from Hillsboro, Oregon
Farmers from Oregon
County commissioners in Oregon
1879 births
1947 deaths